The SD-100 and SD-160 are light rail vehicles (LRV) that were manufactured by Siemens Mobility between 1992 and 2013 for the North American market. The vehicles were all constructed at the Siemens facility in Florin, California.

The primary difference between the models is that the older SD-100 uses direct current motors, while the newer SD-160 uses alternating current motors. Both models were built with a "high-floor" design and could be equipped for level boarding at high-platform stations or with steps and wheelchair lifts for passenger loading at street level.

This model was manufactured and marketed alongside the Siemens SD-400 and SD-460 LRV, which offered both level boarding at high-platform stations and steps for passenger loading at street level.

This model has been replaced by the Siemens S700 and S70, a low-floor LRV for passenger loading at street level and the Siemens S200, a high-floor LRV for level boarding at high-platform stations.

History

Production of the SD-100 was launched in 1992 when the Regional Transportation District, located in Denver, Colorado placed an order for 49 vehicles. The physical design was derived from the U2A car that was built between 1985 and 1991, but built with more modern mechanical equipment.

The first vehicles rolled off the production line at the Siemens facility in Florin, California in 1994, in time for the start of Light Rail service in Denver.

In 1993, the San Diego Metropolitan Transit System ordered 52 SD-100 cars as the  San Diego Trolley system was expanded with a new line, these entered service in 1995. as of 2021 they are currently being phased out and replaced by Siemens S700. 

The final order for the SD-100 came in 1996, when the Utah Transit Authority, located in Salt Lake City placed an order for 23 vehicles that were delivered before the start of the TRAX light rail service in 1999.

In 2001, Siemens launched the SD-160 light rail vehicle, which used alternating current motors instead of direct current motors and outward sliding doors. Calgary Transit ordered 72 vehicles for its CTrain service, while the Utah Transit Authority ordered 17 vehicles as it expanded the TRAX light rail service. Deliveries to both agencies started in 2003.

The physical design of the SD-160 was updated in 2005 with a new end cap that changed the look of the front/rear of the train. The Edmonton Transit Service ordered 57 of the redesigned SD-160 vehicles and Calgary Transit ordered 38.

Starting in late 2017, Calgary has been sending SD-160s to Sacramento for mid-life refurbishment. The refurbished units contain several components and electronics already present on the S200, the successor to the SD-160. Along with some electronic improvements, they have been upgraded to be compatible with Calgary's newer SD-160s, which were previously incompatible due to software differences. The refurbished fleet will eventually start to run with the newer units once the software has been adjusted to allow seamless operation.

Technical details
The brakes also serve as a generator, regenerating power back to a city's electrical lines. The SD-160 has a passenger capacity of 236 passengers (standing) with 64 seats.

Each vehicle also features an onboard closed-circuit TV security camera system for increased passenger safety. Unlike the Siemens SD-100, the Siemens SD-160 does not use the bi-folded doors, instead using sliding doors similar to designs featured on the Siemens S70. In addition, both can be used together in mixed trains consisting of SD-100s and SD-160s. The new, streetcar-length S70 cars ordered for San Diego are designed to be compatible with the SD-100, allowing the SD-100 to operate in a mixed consist, sandwiched between two S70 cars.

The SD-160NG for Calgary have been taking over some features from the SD-460 series including IGBT equipment.

Operators

See also
 Siemens–Duewag U2
 Siemens SD-400
 Siemens SD-460

References

External links
 
 

Siemens tram vehicles
Tram vehicles of Canada
Electric multiple units of the United States
600 V DC multiple units
750 V DC multiple units
Light rail vehicles
Electric multiple units of Canada
Siemens multiple units
Articulated passenger trains